The Army Ground was a cricket ground in Catterick Garrison, North Yorkshire. The Garrison was established in 1914 and construction of a cricket ground for use by the British Army personnel stationed there followed. During the Second World War, services matches were played at the ground. Many of the participants in these matches were enlisted cricketers from Yorkshire, including Bill Bowes, Len Hutton and Hedley Verity. The ground hosted its only first-class cricket match in 1954, when a Combined Services cricket team played the touring Pakistanis. The Combined Services Gerry Tordoff recorded the only first-class century to be made there, with a score of 156 not out in the Combined Services first innings. The match would end in a draw. In 2015, a £25 million retail complex, Princes Gate, opened on the site of the ground.

References

External links
Army Ground at ESPNcricinfo

Cricket grounds in North Yorkshire
Sports venues completed in 1941
Catterick Garrison
Defunct cricket grounds in England